Between Two Women, made in 1945, was the sixteenth film in the Dr Kildare series. This was the fourteenth of fifteen in which Lionel Barrymore starred as Dr. Leonard B. Gillespie. The film following was Dark Delusion (1947), which was the last in the Dr. Kildare series released by Metro-Goldwyn-Mayer (MGM). This was the last of Van Johnson's character, Dr. Randall 'Red' Adams, also seen in three previous Kildare films.

Plot
This episode in the series should have been called Between Three Women, because there are plot strands involving three, not two, women. Dr. Gillespie's (Lionel Barrymore) assistant, Dr. Red Adams (Van Johnson), is still fending off the romantic advances of beautiful blond socialite and social worker Ruth Edley (Marilyn Maxwell), who finally succeeds in winning Red's heart.  The second woman is a pretty night club singer Edna (Gloria DeHaven), who collapses suddenly one night after a show and cannot understand why she is no longer able to eat. Red finds out that a complicated subconscious obsession is the cause. The third woman is Sally (Marie Blake), the reliable and wise-cracking switchboard operator in all of the episodes. Sally is stricken with Bright's Disease and refuses to let anyone besides Red operate on her ailing kidney. Things turn out well for Red and all three women.

There are some scenes in the singer's night club that draw inspiration from the country's immersion in the Second World War. As part of a "home front" money raising contest to help the war effort, Ruth bids extravagant amounts of money for the chance to kiss Red in public.

(Allmovie.com's synopsis of the movie has Red romantically involved with ailing socialite Cynthia Grace (Lucille Bremer), who supposedly suffers from a life-threatening blood clot, but this is the plot for Dark Delusion.)

Cast

Production
The draft script included a plotline involving twin sisters, one of whom is pregnant, that Dr. Adams and Dr. Gillespie believe are the same person. The doctors describe various tests in a comedic competition to prove whether she is pregnant. After reviewing the script, the Motion Picture Producers and Distributors of America, which enforced the Hays Code, objected to details about pregnancy and pregnancy tests. To avoid any financial impact from a rejection of the finished film, MGM eliminated the twins plotline in a script rewrite.

Reception
According to MGM records the movie was the most popular in the series yet, in part because of the rising popularity of Van Johnson. The film earned $1,896,000 in the United States and Canada, and $386,000 elsewhere, making a profit of $1,184,000, a remarkable figure for a B movie.

References

External links
 
 
 
 

1945 films
1945 drama films
American black-and-white films
American drama films
Films directed by Willis Goldbeck
Films set in New York City
Films set on the home front during World War II
Films set in hospitals
Metro-Goldwyn-Mayer films
1940s English-language films
1940s American films